Lugovoye is a rural locality (a selo) and the administrative center of Lugovskoye Rural Settlement, Bogucharsky District, Voronezh Oblast, Russia. The population was 841 as of 2010. There are 10 streets.

Geography 
Lugovoye is located on the Bogucharka River, 20 km west of Boguchar (the district's administrative centre) by road. Raskovka is the nearest rural locality.

References 

Rural localities in Bogucharsky District